Emerald Bay may refer to:

Geography
 Emerald Bay, Catalina Island, California
 Emerald Bay, Orange County, California
 Emerald Bay State Park in El Dorado County, California
 Emerald Bay, Lake Arrowhead, California
 Emerald Bay, Texas

Other
 A code name for the Intel EB440BX chipset
 Emerald Bay Records, a record label
 "Emerald Bay (Prionace Glauca)", a track from the Giant Squid album The Ichthyologist
 Several of the tallest buildings in Myanmar

See also
 Emerald Cove, Antarctica